The PSMM Mk5 multi-purpose patrol boat class gunboat were a class of small military ships built for the United States Navy based on the Asheville class gunboat. The class is called Patrol Ship Multi Mission. The class was used by South Korean, Indonesia, Taiwan and Thailand Navies.

PSMM Mk5 multi-purpose patrol boat class gunboats employed a Combined diesel or gas turbine (CODOG) propulsion system; twin GM 12V149 Diesels for endurance, and a Lycoming TF-40A gas turbine for high-speed dash.

Ships

Republic of Korea Navy

 PGM 581 Paek Ku 52 delivered 14-Mar-75
 PGM 582 Paek Ku 53 delivered 14-Mar-75
 PGM 584	Paek Ku 55 delivered 1-Feb-76
 PGM 585	Paek Ku 56 delivered 1-Feb-76
 PGM 586 - built in South Korea
 PGM 587 - built in South Korea
 PGM 589 - built in South Korea
 PGM 591 - built in South Korea

Republic of China Navy

 Lung Chiang PGG 601 delivered 15-May-78<
 Suijiang PGG 602 built in Taiwan

Republic of Indonesia Navy

Mandau class missile FAC made in South Korea by Korea-Tacoma in Masan with Exocet MM-38

Displacement: 270 tons full load
Dimensions: 50.2 x 7.3 x 2.3 meters (164.6 x 23.9 x 7.5 feet)
Propulsion: 2 shafts; 2 MTU 12V diesel engine, 2,240 bhp; 1 LM 2500 gas turbine, 25,000 shp, 35 knots
Crew: 43
Radar: Racal Decca 1226
Fire Control: Signaal WM-28, Selenia NA-18
EW: Thompson-CSF DR-2000S Mk1 intercept
Armament: 4 MM38 Exocet SSM, 1 57mm/70cal DP, 1 Bofors 40 mm, 2 Rheinmettal 20 mm

Kingdom of Thailand Navy

Sattahip class built in Thailand

Displacement: 300 tons full load
Dimensions: 50.14 x 7.30 x 1.58 meters (164.5 x 24 × 5 feet)
Propulsion: 2 diesels, 2 shafts, 6,840 bhp, 22 knots
Crew: 56
Armament: 1 3/50 SP (76 mm OTO DP in 524–56), 1 40 mm, 2 20 mm, 2 12.7 mm MG

External links
 http://www.navsource.org/
 http://www.hazegray.org/
 https://web.archive.org/web/20110827051501/http://shipbuildinghistory.com/history/shipyards/2large/inactive/tacoma.htm
 http://komandomiliter.blogspot.com/2010/09/kcr-mandau-class.html

Patrol vessels
Gunboat classes